Induno Olona is a town and comune in Italy, in north-western Lombardy,  north of Milan, in the Province of Varese. It has a population, in 2007, of c. 10,200.

Cities and towns in Lombardy